Ralph E. Johnson is a Research Associate Professor in the Department of Computer Science at the University of Illinois at Urbana-Champaign.  He is a co-author of the influential computer science textbook Design Patterns: Elements of Reusable Object-Oriented Software, for which he won the 2010 ACM SIGSOFT Outstanding Research Award. In 2006 he was awarded the Dahl–Nygaard Prize for his contributions to the state of the art embodied in that book as well.

Johnson was an early pioneer in the Smalltalk community and is a continued supporter of the language.  He has held several executive roles at the ACM Object-Oriented Programming, Systems, Languages and Applications conference OOPSLA.  He initiated the popular OOPSLA Design Fest workshop.

References

External links
 Ralph Johnson's blog
 Ralph E. Johnson at UIUC
 Interview with Ralph Johnson from OOPSLA 2009, discussing Parallel Programming Patterns
 Presentation on a Pattern Language for Parallel Programming from QCon London 2010

American computer scientists
Living people
Scientists from Illinois
University of Illinois Urbana-Champaign faculty
Dahl–Nygaard Prize
Year of birth missing (living people)